Benthobatis yangi, the Taiwanese blind electric ray, is a species of fish in the family Narcinidae endemic to Taiwan. Its natural habitat is the upper continental slopes of coastal waters.

Description
Relatively few specimens are known so far. Mature individuals of this species reach a length of 19.1 - 21.5 cm. Both dorsal and ventral surfaces are dark brown to purplish-black, with irregular whitish blotches on the belly. Gill slits are very narrow; the second dorsal fin is slightly larger than first.

Distribution and habitat
The species appears to have a very limited distribution on continental shelves at a depth of less than 300 m, on the coast of southwestern Taiwan (off Tungkang).

Feeding habits
Like all species of electric rays, B. yangi uses its electric shocks to paralyze prey. Remains of polychaete worms are found in some specimens, meaning that these animals are the preferred prey of B. yangi.

Conservation
B. yangi is not a target of fishery but appears to be taken (and discarded) as bycatch in shrimp fisheries, which in the region use very fine nets that likely prevent capture avoidance by the animal. Based on the very limited distribution and possible high rate of bycatch mortality, the IUCN has classified the species as Vulnerable.

References

Narcinidae
Fish described in 2003
Fish of Taiwan
Endemic fauna of Taiwan